Domodossola (Lombard: Dòm) is a city and comune in the Province of Verbano-Cusio-Ossola, in the region of Piedmont, northern Italy. It was also known as  Oscela, Oscella, Oscella dei Leponzi, Ossolo, Ossola  Lepontiorum, and Domo d'Ossola (due to its position in the Ossola valley). The Peruvian aviation pioneer, Jorge Chávez died here in 1910 in an airplane crash.

Geography
Domodossola is situated at the confluence of the Bogna and Toce Rivers and is home to 18,300 people.

The city is located at the foot of the Italian Alps and acts as a minor passenger-rail hub.  Its strategic location accommodates Swiss rail passengers, and Domodossola railway station acts as an international stopping-point between Milan and Brig (a Swiss city of German language) through the Simplon Pass (Italian: Sempione). The Domodossola–Locarno railway is a  line to the east across the border to Locarno.

History
Domodossola was the chief town of the Lepontii when the Romans conquered the region in 12 BCE.

During World War II Domodossola was part of an uprising against the Germans, whereby the valley of Ossola declared itself a free partisan republic in September 1944 and broke away from Fascist Italy. The rebellion was crushed by German troops within less than two months but was an important symbol for anti-fascist movements within Italy until the end of the war.

Main sights
Collegiate church of St. Gervasius and Protasius.

Domodossola railway station designed by Luigi Boffi.
Palazzo Silva (17th century).

Domodossola is most famous for the Sacro Monte Calvario, a site of pilgrimage and worship close to it that has been also recognized as a humanity heritage by UNESCO.

Economy
The economy is mostly based on services, the working of stones, and the mechanics industry. The valleys in the area contain many dams and hydroelectric plants.

Culture
Its name is widely known in Italy as part of the local spelling alphabet as the entry: "D for Domodossola".

Twin towns
 Brig, Switzerland
 Busto Arsizio, Italy

See also
Ossola

References

External links